Karad North Assembly constituency of Maharashtra Vidhan Sabha is one of the constituencies located in the Satara district.

It is a part of the Satara (Lok Sabha constituency), along with five other assembly constituencies, viz Wai, Karad South, Koregaon, Satara and Patan from the Satara district.

Members of Legislative Assembly

Bombay State

Key

Maharashtra State (1962 onwards)
Key

Election results

Assembly elections 2014

See also

 List of constituencies of Maharashtra Legislative Assembly
 Karad

References

Assembly constituencies of Maharashtra
Karad